Barkestad is a small fishing village in Øksnes Municipality in Nordland county, Norway. It is located on the southwest side of the island of Dyrøya in the Vesterålen archipelago. There are only four residents of the village (in 2017) after many years of population decline. They are the only permanent residents of the whole island.

References

Populated places of Arctic Norway
Villages in Nordland
Øksnes